Sislin Fay Allen (20 March 1938 – 5 July 2021), known as Fay Allen, was a British and Jamaican police officer who was the first black woman police constable in the United Kingdom, serving in the Metropolitan Police in London from 1968 to 1972. She also worked for the Jamaica Constabulary Force.

Early life and family 
Allen was born in Jamaica, and moved to the United Kingdom in 1961 or 1962. She lived in Thornton Heath, Croydon. She qualified as a state registered nurse and worked at Queen's Hospital, Croydon, a geriatric facility in south London. She was married to a fellow Jamaican immigrant and had two children.

Career 
Allen had always been interested in the police and in 1968 saw a recruitment advertisement in the newspaper, applied, and was selected. The first black officer in the British police since the 19th century, Norwell Roberts, had only joined the Metropolitan Police the previous year. "On the day I joined I nearly broke a leg trying to run away from reporters," she told an interviewer later. "I realised then that I was a history maker. But I didn't set out to make history; I just wanted a change of direction."

After training at Peel House for 13 weeks, she was posted to Fell Road police station in Croydon, where she lived, on 29 April 1968, aged 29. She experienced more prejudice from the black community than from her colleagues or from white people in Croydon, and was met largely with curiosity and considerable interest from the media, although the Metropolitan Police did receive some racist mail about her appointment. The threatening and abusive letters she received when she started working at Fell Road made her consider whether she wanted to remain in the force. After a year in Croydon, she was posted to the Missing Persons Bureau at Scotland Yard for a while before being transferred back to the beat at Norbury police station.

Later years 
In 1972, she resigned from the Metropolitan Police to return to Jamaica with her family. There she joined the Jamaica Constabulary Force. Eventually, she returned to England; as of 2015, she lived in South London. In 2020, she was given a lifetime achievement award by the National Black Police Association.

She died in Ocho Rios, Jamaica, in July 2021, aged 83. Her death was announced on 5 July.

Footnotes

1938 births
2021 deaths
Jamaican emigrants to the United Kingdom
Women Metropolitan Police officers
Jamaican police officers
Black British police officers
Jamaican nurses
British women nurses
British nurses
Metropolitan Police officers